The Yamaha Bolt or Star Bolt is the US name for a cruiser and café racer motorcycle introduced in 2013 as a 2014 model. It has a 942cc air cooled 4-stroke, 4-valve SOHC V-twin engine. An optional R-Spec model has reservoir shocks. The 2015 Yamaha Bolt, C-Spec and R-Spec were released in July 2014. In 2017 the XV950SCR (Scrambler) was released and the C Spec model was dropped from the lineup.

The Bolt is very well supported by the aftermarket and has proven to be a very customizable platform, lending itself well to the bobber, chopper, rat, and scrambler styles among others. In addition to the large aftermarket companies several smaller companies are also marketing a wide range of parts for these bikes.

In most non-US countries, this model is simply referred to as the "Yamaha XV950" and is available as a standard, or the higher spec "R" and "C" models which features ABS brakes and uprated rear shock absorbers.

External links

Star Bolt
Cruiser motorcycles
Motorcycles introduced in 2013